Unemployment in Croatia relates to the causes and measures of Croatian unemployment. Job creation and unemployment are affected by factors such as economic conditions, high level of corruption in government, global competition, education, automation, and demographics. As of November 2020, there are 156,550 unemployed persons in Croatia. Of these, 24,905 have no work experience. 24.8% of population is at risk of poverty or social exclusion.

Overview

Definitions of employment
A person is considered unemployed if they are of working age and unable to find a job appropriate to their abilities and qualifications. Partially employed people are also considered unemployed, i.e. those who are not working full time and do not earn enough to sustain themselves and their households. There are two different types of unemployment: open unemployment, where a person is not working at all, and hidden unemployment, when the full working potential of a person is not used. Two main sources for the unemployment rate in Croatia are the Croatian Employment Service, with whom unemployed persons seeking employment are registered, and surveys performed by the Croatian Bureau of Statistics.

Unemployment regulations
Croatia is part of the Europe 2020 strategy which aims at smart, sustainable and inclusive growth. The end goals are growth of the GDP and improvement of the job market. Since 2006 the Croatian government has, through various measures and with varied success, attempted to reintegrate the long-term unemployed into the active workforce. Croatia has also instituted the National Youth Programme 2014–2017 and its successor the National Youth Programme 2019–2025 to reduce unemployment among the country's youth.

Unemployment benefits are available under certain conditions. Benefits are given to those who have worked for at least nine months out of the prior twenty-four months. In 2017, for the first 90 days of unemployment, benefits were set at 60% of the referent wage (no more than €526).

Demographics
Unemployment is highest in Split-Dalmatia County (25,408), Zagreb (18,776) and Osijek-Baranja County (17,318), with these three counties accounting for 39.2% of all Croatian unemployment. It is lowest in Lika-Senj County (1,974), Koprivnica-Križevci County (2,232) and Međimurje County (2,441).

As of November 2020, of the 156,550 people considered unemployed, 86,223 are women, 46,666 are below the age of 29, 48,178 are aged 50 and above, and 58,773 are considered to be long-term unemployed.

Historical unemployment

After the war of independence
The widespread destruction, emigration, reduced income from tourism and lack of foreign investment caused by the Croatian War of Independence, fought between 1991 and 1995, had severe effects on the economy. According to data gathered in 1986, 134,341 people were unemployed, with 6,917 receiving monthly unemployment benefits. In the first year of the war, the number of unemployed grew to 264,543, with 75,260 receiving monthly benefits. In the first post-war year, the number of unemployed further grew to 276,290, while the number of people receiving benefits dropped to 52,912.

Between 1990 and 2002, the number of people being laid off was greater than the number of people employed, a situation which gradually started improving in 2002.

The 2007/08 economic crisis
From 2009 to 2014, Croatia was recovering from a deep and long-lasting recession caused by the financial crisis of 2007–2008. The economy recorded negative growth for six consecutive years, with a total drop in GDP of 12%. Near the end of this economic downturn, in 2013, only 57.2% of the adult working population (aged 20–64) were employed, with 30% of the total population at risk of poverty. Between 2015 and 2018, there was a cumulative growth in GDP of 11.5%, although the real GPD remained below pre-crisis levels. In 2018, 65.2% of the adult working population was employed, an improvement over 2013, although the youth unemployment rate (active population aged 15–24) dropped from 50% to 23.7%. At the time, Croatia had an employment activity rate of 71%, which was below the European average of 78.4%. The reasons for this were retirements following privatizations, war veterans entering retirement, and prolonged education, as well as family and caring responsibilities. The unemployment rate peaked in 2013 at 17.3% and lowered to 8.5% in 2018. In 2018, 7% of the population was available to work, but not seeking it. Long-term unemployment was at 40% of the total.

The COVID-19 pandemic
After declaring COVID-19 a pandemic on 11 March 2020, the Croatian government implemented certain restrictions to combat it. These measures affected employment as well. According to Eurostat, unemployment numbers rose from 122,000 to 147,000 between March and December 2020, which meant the rate of unemployment rose from 6.8% to 8.1%. One of the main sectors impacted by the pandemic was the tourism industry, which further impacted as many as 20,000 seasonal workers. The government responded to this with measures aiming at keeping employment up through financial help for large and small businesses.

See also
 List of European Union member states by unemployment rate
 Involuntary unemployment

References

Croatia
Economy of Croatia
Labor in Croatia